The Open Door Limestone is a geologic formation in Wyoming. It preserves fossils dating back to the Cambrian period.

See also

 List of fossiliferous stratigraphic units in Wyoming
 Paleontology in Wyoming

References
 

Cambrian geology of Wyoming
Cambrian southern paleotropical deposits